Pomaderris pauciflora is a species of flowering plant in the family Rhamnaceae and is endemic to the south-east of continental Australia. It is a shrub with hairy stems, mostly lance-shaped leaves with the narrower end towards the base, and panicles of cream-coloured flowers.

Description
The upper surface of the leaves have a few bristly hairs, the lower surface densely covered with woolly, star-shaped hairs. Flowering occurs in October and November and the fruit is a hairy capsule.

Taxonomy
Pomaderris pauciflora was first formally described in 1951 by Norman Arthur Wakefield in The Victorian Naturalist from specimens collected near the Upper Genoa River in 1948. The specific epithet (pauciflora) means "few-flowered".

Distribution and habitat
This pomaderris usually grows in rocky places along watercourses from south of Merriwa in New South Wales to the banks of the Genoa and Snowy Rivers in Victoria.

References

Flora of New South Wales
Flora of Victoria (Australia)
pauciflora
Plants described in 1951
Taxa named by Norman Arthur Wakefield